The Burkinabé Swimming and Life Saving Federation, is the national governing body for the sport of swimming in Burkina Faso.

References

National members of the African Swimming Confederation
Sports governing bodies in Burkina Faso
Swimming in Burkina Faso
2000 establishments in Burkina Faso
Sports organizations established in 2000